Paul Walker (born 3 November 1950) is a former Australian rules footballer who played the games for Collingwood in the Victorian Football League (VFL) in the late 1960s.

References

External links 

1950 births
Australian rules footballers from Victoria (Australia)
Collingwood Football Club players
Preston Football Club (VFA) players
Living people